Korkut Boratav (born 1935) is a Turkish Marxian economist.

Career

Boratav was born in Konya. After his graduation from Ankara Gazi Lycee in 1955, he continued his studies at Ankara University, Law School. In 1960 he became a lecturer and researcher in that university in Finance and Economics, by getting a postgraduate degree on Public Finances. He was granted a doctoral degree in 1964 with his thesis about “income distribution and public finance”. 

He taught at Cambridge University between 1964-1966. In 1972 he was granted an assistant professorship at Ankara University for his thesis on "Progress of the Socialist Planned Economy". In 1975, he worked as a specialist in the Health and Welfare Department of the United Nations Organisation, in Geneva, Switzerland. 

In early 1980, he became a professor at Ankara University. But after three years, he was dismissed from his position after the "1402" law put into effect by the Military coup of 1980 in Turkey. He then taught at the University of Zimbabwe in Harare from 1984–1986 and thereafter returned to his previous position at Ankara University. 

He has retired from teaching since 2002. He was honored in 2005 by a conference about his work, organized by Ankara University and History Foundation of Turkey. He continues to publish as one of the most influential scholars of Turkish economy and economic history. Boratav is a member of the Advisory Board of Praksis, a Turkish journal of social sciences. He is the son of renowned Turkish folklorist Pertev Naili Boratav.

Works 
 Türkiye’de Devletçilik 1923-1950 (Statism in Turkey 1923-1950) (1962)
 Gelir Dağılımı ve Kamu Maliyesi (Income distribution and public finance) (1965)
 Uluslararası Sömürü ve Türkiye (The international exploitation and Turkey) (1979)
 Tarımsal Yapılar ve Kapitalizm (Agrarian structures and  Capitalism) (1980)
 Bölüşüm Sorunları ve İktisat Politikaları (Problems of economic distribution and economy policies) (1983)
 Türk İktisat Tarihi 1908-1985 (Economic History Of Turkey 1908-1985) (1988) .

References

Turkish non-fiction writers
Marxian economists
Academic staff of Ankara University
People from Konya
Ankara University Faculty of Law alumni
Academic staff of the University of Zimbabwe
1935 births
Living people
Turkish Marxists
20th-century Turkish economists
BirGün people